Pokémon: Black & White: Rival Destinies (advertised as Pokémon: BW: Rival Destinies), known in Japan as  and , is the fifteenth season of the Pokémon anime series and the second season of Pokémon the Series: Black & White, known in Japan as . It originally aired in Japan from September 22, 2011 to October 4, 2012, on TV Tokyo, and in the United States from February 18, 2012, to January 26, 2013, on Cartoon Network, covering the continuing adventures of series protagonist Ash Ketchum and his Pikachu as they continue traveling through Unova with Cilan and Iris.

In Japan, the episodes comprising this season aired as part of the Best Wishes!, under two subtitles. The first thity-six episodes were aired in Japan as the second half of ), having their initial run in Japan from September 22, 2011 until June 14, 2012. The next thirteen episodes were broadcast under the subtitle , first airing in Japan on June 21 through October 4, 2012. In these episodes, Ash will take on his remaining five gym badges.

The Japanese opening songs are "Best Wishes!" (ベストウイッシュ!, Besuto Uisshu!) and "Be an Arrow!" (やじるしになって!, Yajirushi ni Natte!) by Rika Matsumoto. The ending songs are "Can You Name All the Pokemon? BW" (ポケモン言えるかな? BW, Pokémon Ierukana? BW) by Takeshi Tsuruno, "Seven-colored Arch" (七色アーチ, Nanairo Āchi) by the Pokémon BW Choral Gang (Aki Okui, Toshiko Ezaki, and Fumie Akiyoshi), "Look Look☆Here" (みてみて☆こっちっち, Mite Mite☆Kotchitchi) by Momoiro Clover Z, "Team Rocket Forever" (ロケット団よ永遠に, Roketto-dan yo Eien ni) by the Team Rocket Gang, and the English opening song is "Rival Destinies" by Alex Nackman and Kathryn Raio. Its instrumental version serves as the ending theme.



Episode list

Home media releases 
Viz Media and Warner Home Video have released the series on DVD in the United States.

The first volume was released on September 10, 2013, and the second was released on December 3, 2013, both releases were two-disc boxsets containing 12 episodes each. The third volume, released on March 18, 2014, was a four-disc boxset containing 25 episodes.

Viz Media and Warner Home Video released Pokémon: Black & White: Rival Destinies – The Complete Season on DVD on March 15, 2022.

Notes

References

External links 
 Pokémon anime website at TV Tokyo 
 Pocket Monsters: Best Wishes! website at TV Tokyo 
 Pokémon TV Anime at Pokémon JP official website 

2011 Japanese television seasons
2012 Japanese television seasons
Season15

it:Pokémon Nero e Bianco: Destini Rivali